Hanco Olivier (born 17 October 1995) is a South African first-class cricketer. He is a right-handed batsman and a Right arm off break bowler.

Olivier made his First Class debut for North West against Western Province on 7 January 2016. He made his List A debut for Free State in the 2018–19 CSA Provincial One-Day Challenge on 31 March 2019.

References

External links
 

1995 births
Living people
South African cricketers
North West cricketers
Free State cricketers